Yang Dacai is a Chinese former politician. He was the head of the Shaanxi province work safety administration when a viral photo of him at the scene of the Shaanxi bus–tanker crash showed him wearing a luxury timepiece caused a public outcry against corruption in China.  Chinese netizens found images of Yang on Xina Weibo wearing at least 10 different watches. The Xi'an Intermediate People's Court issued a prison sentence of 14 years for taking bribes and possessing assets of unclear origin. Since Yang was smiling in the original photo and in images taken during his sentencing, he became known as the "smiling official" as well as 'Brother Watch'.

See also
Human flesh search engine

References

Living people
Chinese politicians convicted of corruption
2012 in China
2015 in China
History of Shaanxi
Expelled members of the Chinese Communist Party
Year of birth missing (living people)